Santa Mesa station is a railway station located on the South Main Line in the city of Manila, Philippines. It is one of two stations (the other is Pasay Road) in the line to have its own access road.

The station is the fourth station southbound from Tutuban and is the only railway station serving Santa Mesa.

In addition to having its own dedicated access road, Santa Mesa station is also one of three stations (the others being Pasay Road and España) to have its original platforms extended and raised in order to accommodate new PNR diesel multiple units. The original platforms have been retained for the use of Commuter Express locomotives and especially for intercity trains, although Santa Mesa is not designated as a station where these trains can stop.  The station used to serve the Santa Mesa-Mandaluyong branch line, also known as Guadalupe line, which used to run up to Antipolo and Montalban. This line has since been dismantled.

History
Santa Mesa was opened on December 22, 1905 as a station originally situated on the Antipolo and Montalban lines. From this station, the Main Line South, as well as its subsequent branch lines which were later abandoned (Naic and Carmona, Cavite; Batangas; Bay, Santa Cruz and Pagsanjan, Laguna; Canlubang, Laguna), branched out southwest from the line heading east southeast to Antipolo and Montalban. Main Line South was constructed not long afterward and was the first railway line of Manila Railroad Company (MRR, later PNR) crossing the Pasig River, with Pandacan and all the oil refineries and other branch lines, including one right to the former site of Philippine Vegetable Oil Company in Santa Mesa, being constructed right after the Pasig River bridge.

Station Layout

Nearby landmarks
The station is near landmarks such as the Santa Mesa Public Market, SM City Sta. Mesa, Puregold Sta. Mesa, the main campus of the Polytechnic University of the Philippines (PUP), the Eulogio "Amang" Rodriguez Institute of Science and Technology (EARIST), the Sacred Heart of Jesus Catholic School, and the Philippine headquarters of the Tzu Chi Foundation.

Transportation links
Santa Mesa station is accessible by jeepneys and buses plying the Ramon Magsaysay Boulevard route.  Several cycle rickshaw terminals are also located near the station.

A Line 2 station, Pureza, is a short walk from Santa Mesa station. Alternately, commuters may opt to ride tricycles to there.

Reconstruction
Santa Mesa station will be reconstructed as part of the North–South Commuter Railway.

References

Philippine National Railways stations
Railway stations in Metro Manila
Railway stations opened in 2009
Buildings and structures in Santa Mesa